Freddy Breck (Gerhard Breker; 21 January 1942, in Sonneberg, Thuringia – 17 December 2008, in Rottach-Egern, Upper Bavaria) was a German schlager singer, composer, record producer, and news anchor.

Breck studied to be a machinist, then studied singing under Heinz Gietz. He sang schlager songs which were based on well-known classical melodies. His first success was "Überall auf der Welt", based on Va, pensiero from Giuseppe Verdi's Nabucco. This he recorded in English as "We Believe in Tomorrow" and released it as a single in late 1972 - it topped the South African Charts in early 1973. He went on to score 5 platinum records and 35 gold records over the course of his career.

In 1978, he issued an English language disc. In the 1980s, he worked as a news presenter for various stations, and wrote music for groups such as the Original Naabtal Duo, the Kastelruther Spatzen and Nina & Mike. He founded his own record label, Sun Day Records, with his wife Astrid in 1998, and in 1999 they released music as a duo, Astrid & Freddy Breck.

Breck died of cancer in December 2008.

Discography

1973 Rote Rosen für dich
1974 Die Welt ist voll Musik
1975 Mit einem bunten Blumenstrauß
1977 Die Sterne steh’n gut
1977 Mach was Schönes aus diesem Tag
1978 Sommerliebe
1978 Years of love
1981 Melodien zum Verlieben
1982 Meine Lieder, meine Träume
1985 Deutschlands schönste Volkslieder (und die Sonntagskinder)
1991 Für Dich
1992 Mein leises Du
1995 So wie ich bin
1997 Ich liebe Dich
2004 Wir zwei
Weihnachten mit Freddy Breck

Singles
1972 "Überall auf der Welt", based on Giuseppe Verdi's Nabucco
1973 "Bianca", based on Tchaikovsky's Capriccio Italien
1973 "Rote Rosen", in English version Love and Roses, based on Franz von Suppé's Dichter und Bauer
1974 "Halli, Hallo"
1974 "Die Sonne geht auf"
1974 "Mit einem bunten Blumenstrauß"
1975 "Der große Zampano"
1976 "Das ist die wahre Liebe"
1976 "Der weiße Flieder"
1977 "Die Sterne steh’n gut"
1977 "Im Schatten der alten Kastanie"
1977 "Überall, wo die Meisjes sind"
1978 "Mach was Schönes aus diesem Tag"
1978 "Amigo Perdido"
1979 "Mädchen"
1981 "Frauen und Wein"
1986 "Monica", based on Johann Strauss junior's waltz Wiener Blut
1991 "Herz Ass ist Trumpf"

Chart positions
"Überall auf der Welt"
Germany: 7
Netherlands: 7
"Bianca"
Germany: 2
Belgium: 1
Netherlands: 3
Austria: 11
Switzerland: 4
"Rote Rosen"
Germany: 2
Netherlands: 1
Austria: 7
Switzerland: 9
"Halli, hallo"
Germany: 21
Netherlands: 13
"So in Love with You"
UK: 44
"Die Sonne geht auf"
Germany: 31
Netherlands: 13
"Mit einem bunten Blumenstrauß"
Netherlands: 24
"Der große Zampano"
Germany: 16
Netherlands: 19
"Das ist die wahre Liebe"
Germany: 47
"Die Sterne steh'n gut"
Germany: 48

References

1942 births
2008 deaths
People from Sonneberg
20th-century German male singers
Deaths from cancer in Germany